The Powerlist is a list of the 100 most influential people of African or African Caribbean heritage in the United Kingdom. The list is updated annually and has been published in book format by Powerful Media since 2007. The Powerlist is not limited to British-born citizens and includes immigrants to the UK.

History and methodology 
The list was first created in 2007 by Michael Eboda, then editor of the New Nation, a weekly newspaper published in the UK for the Black British community, as a way to profile and celebrate influential Black Britons, and inspire and influence the next generation. The first Powerlist was compiled after six months of research and debate where 400 people of influence were whittled down to 50 women and 50 men, then ranked into respective top tens with the results announced in August 2007. During the first few editions, separate top 10 rankings were produced for both Female and Male candidates and top ranking individuals could continue to be ranked the following year. From 2012 the 50 highest rated nominees, along with updates on the previous year's Powerlistees from rank 2–100, are then ranked by an independent panel in the summer, with the list being produced each autumn. Each year's highest-ranking individual is added to the Powerlist Hall of Fame

Hall of Fame 
A list of every Powerlist highest ranking individual.

2020s

2022 Powerlist Rankings

The panel of judges was led by the retired high court judge Dame Linda Dobbs.

Top 10

2021 Powerlist Rankings
The 2021 Powerlist came in a year in which public debate on racial injustice had increased, with the Black Lives Matter movement and global protests against police brutality. Therefore, chief executive Michael Eboda decided that the 14th Powerlist would honour those who have used their voice to advocate against racial injustice. Due to the ongoing COVID-19 pandemic, the awards were held virtually on November 17, 2020 and hosted by Kwame Kwei-Armah, OBE. The event was held in partnership with J. P. Morgan who announced they would invest £2 million in support to London non-profit organisations headed by black and minority ethnic leaders; further sponsors included PricewaterhouseCoopers, Facebook, and Linklaters. The independent panel of judges named Sir Lewis Hamilton as the most influential due to both his sporting excellence and his advocacy in light of the BLM movement; additional highlights of the Top 10 included Prof. Kevin Fenton and Dame Donna Kinnair for their work fighting against COVID-19.

Top 10

Also in the Top 100, by category

Arts, Fashion and Design
 Chi-chi Nwanoku, OBE - Classical Musician & Founder of Chineke! Orchestra
 Duro Olowu  - Fashion Designer
 Dr Shirley J Thompson, OBE - Composer, Conductor and Reader in Music, University of Westminster
 Pat McGrath, MBE - Make-up Artist & founder of Pat McGrath Labs
 Francesca Hayward - Principal Dancer, The Royal Ballet
 Grace Wales Bonner - Fashion Designer, Founder and Creative Director at Wales Bonner
 Kobna Holdbrook-Smith - Actor and Founding Member of 'Act for Change'
 John Boyega - Actor
 Idris Elba, OBE - Actor and Producer

Business, Corporate, Financiers and Entrepreneurs
 Femi Bamisaiye - CIO Homeserve 
 Nadja Bellan-White - Global CMO at Vice Media Group
 Jason Black (J2K) - Co-founder of Crep Protect and Co-Owner of Crepe and Cones
 Eric Collins - CEO and Founding Member, Impact X Capital Partners
 Camille Drummond - Vice President, Global Business Services at BP
 Yemi Edun - Founder/CEO of Daniel Ford & Co.
 Emeka Emembolu - Senior VP-North Sea BP
 Dean Forbes - President, The Access Group
 Pamela Hutchinson - Global Head of Diversity and Inclusion, Bloomberg
 Yvonne Ike  - Managing Director and Head of Sub Saharan Africa region, BofA Securities
 Adrian Joseph - Managing Director, Group AI & Data Solutions, BT Group
 Wol Kolade -  Managing Partner, Livingbridge
 Lindelwe Lesley Ndlovu  - CEO, AXA Africa Specialty Risks, Lloyd's of London
 Tara Lajumoke - Managing Director, Financial Times
 Netsai Mangwende - Head of Finance for Great Britain, Willis Towers Watson
 Tunde Olanrewaju - Senior Partner McKinsey & Company
 Paulette Rowe - CEO, Integrated and E-commerce Solutions, Paysafe Group
 Roni Savage - Managing Director, Founder of Jomas Associates
 Alan Smith - Global Head of Risk Strategy and Chief of Staff, Global Risk at HSBC
 Tevin Tobun - Founder and CEO, GV Group Gate Ventures
 Sandra Wallace - UK Managing Partner, DLA Piper
 Dame Sharon White - Chairman, John Lewis Partnership

Media, Publishing and Entertainment
 Kamal Ahmed - Editorial Director, BBC News
 Akala - Rapper, journalist, poet and activist
 Amma Asante, MBE - Writer, Director
 Lorna Clarke - BBC Controller of Pop Music
 Reni Eddo-Lodge - Journalist, author
 Bernardine Evaristo - Writer, Professor of Creative Writing at Brunel University London
 Sir Lenny Henry - Actor, writer, campaigner
 Vanessa Kingori, MBE - Publisher, British Vogue
 Dorothy Koomson - Author
 Anne Mensah - Vice-president of Content UK, Netflix
 Hugh Muir - Senior assistant editor, The Guardian
 Femi Oguns, MBE - Founder and CEO of Identity School of Acting
 Marcus Ryder - Executive producer of Multimedia Caixin
 Paulette Simpson - Executive, Corporate Affairs and Public Policy, Jamaica National Group; Executive Director, The Voice Media Group
 Annette Thomas - CEO The Guardian Media Group
 Charlene White - ITN News Anchor
 Reggie Yates - Actor, broadcaster & DJ
 Gary Younge - Journalist and author; Prof. of Sociology University of Manchester

Politics, Law and Religion
 Stephanie Boyce - Deputy Vice-President Law Society of England and Wales
 Martin Forde, QC - Barrister
 Rev Rose Hudson-Wilkin - Bishop of Dover
 David Lammy, MP - Shadow Secretary of State for Justice, Member of Parliament for Tottenham
 Harry Matovu, QC - Barrister
 Dr Kathryn Nwajiaku - Director, Politics and Governance Overseas Development Institute
 Dr Sandie Okoro - Senior Vice President and Group General Counsel, World Bank
 Segun Osuntokun - Managing Partner, Bryan Cave Leighton Paisner
 Joshua Siaw, MBE - Partner, White & Case
 Patrick Vernon, OBE - Political activist
 Marcia Willis Stewart, QC - Director, Birnberg Peirce & Partners

Public, Third Sector and Education
 Sonita Alleyne, OBE - Master, Jesus College, Cambridge
 Dr Margaret Casely-Hayford, CBE - Chair, Shakespeare's Globe, Chancellor of Coventry University, Non-Executive Director, Co-op Group
 Nira Chamberlain - President of Institute of Mathematics and its Applications
 Professor Patricia Daley - Vice Principle of Jesus College, Cambridge
 Dr Anne-Marie Imafidon, MBE - CEO and Co-Founder Stemettes
 Professor Funmi Olonisakin - Professor of Security, Leadership and Development at King's College London, Founding Director of African Leadership Centre
 Marvin Rees - Mayor of Bristol
 Lord Woolley - Co-founder/Director, Operation Black Vote

Science, Medicine and Engineering
 Dr Sylvia Bartley - Senior Global Director, Medtronic Foundation
 Professor Jacqueline Dunkley-Bent, OBE - Chief Midwifery Officer, NHS England
 Dr Jacqui Dyer, MBE - President of Mental Health Foundation
 Dr Paula Franklin - Chief Medical Officer at Bupa
 Dr Martin Griffiths - Lead trauma surgeon, Royal London Hospital & Clinical Director for Violence Reduction, NHS
 Dr Ian Nnatu - Consultant psychiatrist
 Dr Joy Odili - Consultant plastic surgeon
 Dr Emeka Okaro - Consultant Obstetrician and Gynaecologist
 Prof. Laura Serrant, OBE - Head of Department and Professor of Community and Public Health Nursing at Manchester Metropolitan University
 Dr Samantha Tross - Consultant Orthopaedic Surgeon

Sports
 Dina Asher Smith - British record-holding sprinter
 Anthony Joshua, OBE - Boxer
 Marcus Rashford - Footballer and campaigner against child poverty
 Raheem Sterling - Footballer

Technology
 Nneka Abulokwe, OBE - Founder and CEO, MicroMax Consulting
 Ije Nwokorie - Senior Director, Apple Inc.
 Ebele Okobi - Public policy director, Africa, the Middle East and Turkey for Facebook
 Jacky Wright - Chief digital officer & Corporate VP at Microsoft

2020 Powerlist
The 13th annual Powerlist was judged by a panel chaired by Dame Linda Dobbs and published in October 2019; sponsored by J.P. Morgan & Co., pwc, linklaters and The Executive Leadership Council.

2010s

2019 Rankings
The 2019 Rankings were released in October 2018 and saw Meghan, Duchess of Sussex included in the list for the first time and named Ric Lewis as the most influential individual. For the full list see: Powerlist 2019

2018 Rankings
The 2018 Rankings were released in October 2017 and saw Gina Miller named as the most influential black person in the UK. The list was compiled by a panel that included Dame Linda Dobbs and Tim Campbell and over half of the 100 people on the years list were women.

2017 Rankings
The 2017 Powerlist marked the 10th anniversary of the event, with a keynote speech made by Mayor of London, Sadiq Khan were released in October 2016 and named as the most influential black person in the UK. The list was decided by an independent panel led by former high court judge Dame Linda Dobbs.

2016 Rankings
The 2016 Powerlist named Sir Ken Olisa, OBE at the most influential Black Briton for his charitable work and his achievement becoming the first black Lord-Lieutenant of Greater London.

2015 Rankings
The 2015 Powerlist was announced in November 2014 and took place in the Lord Mayor of London's residence, with a keynote speech given by then Home Secretary, Theresa May. The list named Karen Blackett, OBE as the most influential Black Briton, marking her as the first Black businesswoman to be awarded the accolade and also saw two people ranked in both third & eighth position.

2014 Rankings
An independent panel of five judges, headed by management consultant Vivian Hunt and including business executive Olakunle Babarinde, ranked the 100 most influential Black Britons on merit with children's author Malorie Blackman, OBE first in the yearly ranking.

2013 Rankings
The sixth annual Powerlist edition was announced in October 2012, ranking Britons who have "the ability to alter events and change lives in a positive way" and 20,000 hard copies were distributed to schools across the UK.

2012 Rankings
The 2012 Powerlist edition was announced in November 2011, and the judging panel was chaired by Baroness Amos. It ranked Tidjane Thiam, CEO of FTSE 100 company Prudential plc, as number one. 

2011 Powerlist
The 2011 Powerlist had a panel including Baroness Amos and Kwame Kwei-Armah who ranked Tidjane Thiam, CEO of FTSE 100 company Prudential plc first, with Diane Abbott MP ranking ninth.

Others listed included the financier Donna St Hill, the peer Victor Adebowale, Baron Adebowale, the judge Dame Linda Dobbs, the pharmaceutical executive Yvonne Greenstreet, the investor Tsega Gebreyes, the make-up artist Dame Pat McGarth, the strategy consultant Dame Vivian Hunt, the venture capitalist Wol Kolade and CPS Chief Inspector Mike Fuller.

2010 Powerlist
The 2010 Powerlist was released in September 2009 and marked the beginning of the annual list being published in the Autumn prior. The launch took place in the Cabinet room at 10 Downing Street and now included men & women in a single table.

2000's

Prior to 2010, the Powerlist had a different format and was published in conjunction with newspaper The New Nation''. During its first few years, separate top 10 rankings were produced for both female and male candidates. In addition, top-ranking individuals were not promoted to the 'Hall of Fame', meaning they could continue to be ranked the following year.

2008 Powerlist
The 2008 Powerlist was compiled of 50 men and 50 women by a judging panel that included Baroness Amos and Kwame Kwei-Armah. It was published in October 2008 by Powerful Media sponsored by JP Morgan, and was the first annual powerlist report. Copies were sold in store and sent to the UK's 1000 largest companies with a reception held at the Foreign Office to celebrate those on the list. To qualify, entrants had to be a British citizen or based in Britain.

Top 10 Men

Top 10 Women

2007 Powerlist
The first edition of the Powerlist was compiled after six months of research and debate where 400 people of influence were whittled down to 50 women and 50 men, then ranked into respective top tens and announced in August 2007.

Top 10 Men

Top 10 Women

See also
Black British elite
Black British people

References

External links
 Powerlist

Publications established in 2007
Yearbooks
Biographical dictionaries
Lists of British people
2007 establishments in the United Kingdom
Black elite